The men's 5000 metres at the 1962 European Athletics Championships was held in Belgrade, then Yugoslavia, at JNA Stadium on 13 and 15 September 1962.

Medalists

Results

Final
15 September

Heats
13 September

Heat 1

Heat 2

Heat 3

Participation
According to an unofficial count, 27 athletes from 16 countries participated in the event.

 (1)
 (2)
 (2)
 (3)
 (3)
 (1)
 (1)
 (2)
 (1)
 (1)
 (3)
 (1)
 (1)
 (1)
 (3)
 (1)

References

5000 metres
5000 metres at the European Athletics Championships